Leo D. Sullivan is a writer and director of animated films in the United States who is seen as a pioneer in black animation. With Floyd Norman, who he met working on Beanie and Cecil, he launched Vignette Films, later Vignette Multimedia, who worked on the original animated Soul Train logo. They also produced short films geared toward a high school audience on African-American figures. 

Sullivan worked for Bob Clampett Productions as an animation cel polisher before moving up to working as an artist and animator. Over a more than sixty year career, he and his wife collaborated on improving animation for black children. His company, Leo Sullivan Multimedia, is behind brands such as AfroKids.

Sullivan and Norman's work was recognized by the Black Filmmakers Hall of Fame in 1991 and Sullivan received an Emmy in 1992 as a Timing Director.
Interviews of Sullivan are featured prominently in the documentary Floyd Norman: An Animated Life (2016) by Michael Fiore.

Filmography
Round Trip to the Moon (1972)
Examining the Moon (1972)
Men to Meet the Challenge (1972)
Living in  Space (1972)

References

American animators
Year of birth missing
Year of birth missing (living people)